Events from the year 1857 in Sweden

Incumbents
 Monarch – Oscar I

Events

 6 June – Wedding between Prince Oscar and Sophie of Nassau.
 12 June – Elfrida Andrée becomes the first female organist in Sweden. 
 A regulation of Gamla stan is proposed by A. E. Schuldheis and discussed in the parliament. Gets rejected two years later.

Births
 13 March  – Hilda Sachs, journalist and women's rights activist  (died 1935)
 21 April –  Elisabet Anrep-Nordin, pedagogue (died 1947)
 27 October – Ernst Trygger, professor and politician (died 1943) 
 Amanda Horney, politician (Social Democrat), trade unionist and women's right activist (died 1953)

Deaths

 2 April - Jeanette Granberg, playwright  (born 1825) 
 - Halta-Kajsa, tradition bearer  (born 1792)

References

 
Years of the 19th century in Sweden
Sweden